John James Diamond (30 October 1910 — 08 July 1961) was an English professional footballer who played as a forward.

References

1910 births
1961 deaths
English footballers
Footballers from Middlesbrough
Hull City A.F.C. players
Shelbourne F.C. players
Southport F.C. players
Barnsley F.C. players
Cardiff City F.C. players
Bury F.C. players
Oldham Athletic A.F.C. players
Hartlepool United F.C. players
English Football League players
Association football forwards